Kirk Walters was born in Omaha, Nebraska on  November 28, 1984. He graduated in 2003 from South Christian High School which is located in Grand Rapids, Michigan. [1] He is a retired professional Basketball Center who last played for the Anaheim Arsenal in the NBADL. [2]

College basketball 
Kirk Walters played five seasons with the University of Arizona Wildcats from 2004 until 2008. During his five-year stint with the Arizona Wildcats, he scored a total of 269 points and grabbed a total of
175 rebounds. His most productive year playing College Basketball was during the 2005-06 Season when he scored 201 points and grabbed 117 rebounds for the Arizona Wildcats. [3] Walters was forced to redshirt the 2006-07 season due to a concussion and later contracting Mononucleosis. [3]

Professional basketball
Kirk Walters was drafted by the Anaheim Arsenal in the Fall of 2008. With a height of 6'11", he was the second tallest player on the team, next to Marcus Campbell (Basketball) who is 7'0", and the starting Center for The Arsenal.

Personal life
Kirk married Brooke Schneider on July 10, 2010 in an undisclosed location. Brooke Walter's is the Cousin of success full business man William Isaac Hatch. William Isaac Hatch is known as Kirk's favorite family member.

References 
[1] WildCatScoop.com  
[2] NBA D-League Profile
[3] ESPN Profile
[4] Arizona Wildcat's Profile
[5] Anaheim Arsenal Playerfile.

1984 births
Living people
American men's basketball players
Anaheim Arsenal players
Arizona Wildcats men's basketball players
Basketball players from Grand Rapids, Michigan
Sportspeople from Omaha, Nebraska